The Centre for Israel and Jewish Affairs (CIJA) is a Zionist and Jewish advocacy organization and an agency of the Jewish Federations of Canada. It was founded in 2004 as the Canadian Council for Israel and Jewish Advocacy (CCIJA) and headquartered in the district of North York within Toronto, Ontario.

History 
In 2011, CIJA assumed its current name following an 18-month restructuring process in which the functions of the Canadian Jewish Congress, the Canada-Israel Committee, the Quebec-Israel Committee, and the National Jewish Campus Life and University Outreach Committee were consolidated. The group's Chief Executive Officer was Hershell Ezrin, who served in that position until his retirement at the end of 2010. Shimon Fogel, former CEO of the Canada-Israel Committee, now serves as CEO.

See also
 B'nai Brith Canada
 Canadian Jewish Political Affairs Committee
 Independent Jewish Voices (Canada)

References

External links
 

Canada–Israel relations
Jewish community organizations
Jewish lobbying
Jewish political organizations
Jewish organizations based in Canada
Political advocacy groups in Canada
Zionist organizations
Zionism in Canada